The Capreolinae,  Odocoileinae, or the New World deer are a subfamily of deer. Alternatively, they are known as the telemetacarpal deer, due to their bone structure being different from the plesiometacarpal deer subfamily Cervinae. The telemetacarpal deer maintain their distal lateral metacarpals, while the plesiometacarpal deer maintain only their proximal lateral metacarpals.
The Capreolinae are believed to have originated in the Middle Miocene, between 7.7 and 11.5 million years ago, in Central Asia.

Although this subfamily is called New World deer in English, it includes reindeer, moose, and roe deer, all of which live in Eurasia in the Old World.

Classification
The following extant genera and species are recognized:
 Tribe Capreolini
 Genus †Procapreolus
 Genus Capreolus
 Western roe deer (C. capreolus)
 Eastern roe deer (C. pygargus)
Genus Hydropotes
 Water deer (H. inermis)
 Tribe Alceini
Genus †Cervalces
 †C. gallicus?
 †C. carnutorum
 †C. scotti
 †C. latifrons
Genus Alces
 Moose or Eurasian elk (A. alces)
 Tribe Odocoileini
Genus †Pavlodaria
 Genus Rangifer
 Caribou/reindeer (R. tarandus)
 Genus Odocoileus
 Mule deer (O. hemionus)
 White-tailed deer (O. virginianus)
 Yucatan brown brocket (O. pandora)
 †American mountain deer (O. lucasi)
 Genus Blastocerus
 Marsh deer (B. dichotomus)
 Genus Hippocamelus
 Taruca (H. antisensis)
 South Andean deer or huemul (H. bisulcus)
 Genus Mazama
 Gray brocket (M. gouazoubira)
 Northern Venezuelan brocket (M. cita, considered by some authorities to be a subspecies of M. gouazoubira)
 Ecuador brocket (M. murelia, considered by some authorities to be a subspecies of M. gouazoubira)
 Isla San Jose brocket (M. permira, considered by some authorities to be a subspecies of M. gouazoubira)
 Colombian brocket (M. sanctaemartae, considered by some authorities to be a subspecies of M. gouazoubira)
 Brazilian brocket (M. superciliaris, considered by some authorities to be a subspecies of M. gouazoubira)
 Peruvian brocket (M. tschudii, considered by some authorities to be a subspecies of M. gouazoubira)
 Rodon (M. rondoni, considered by some authorities to be a subspecies of M. gouazoubira)
 Amazonian brown brocket (M. nemorivaga)
 Central American red brocket (M. temama)
 Small red brocket or bororo (M. bororo)
 Dwarf brocket (M. chunyi)
 Pygmy brocket (M. nana)
 Merida brocket (M. bricenii)
 Little red brocket (M. rufina)
 American red brocket (M. americana) (This species has found to be closer to Odocoileus than other brockets.)
 Ecuador red brocket (Mazama gualea, considered by some authorities to be a subspecies of M. americana)
 Brazilian red brocket (M. jucunda, considered by some authorities to be a subspecies of M. americana)
 Yucatan brown brocket (M. pandora)
 Trinidad red brocket (M. trinitatis, considered by some authorities to be a subspecies of M. americana)
 Southern red brocket (Mazama whitelyi, considered by some authorities to be a subspecies of M. americana)
 Peruvian red brocket (Mazama zamora, considered by some authorities to be a subspecies of M. americana)
 Colombian red brocket (Mazama zetta, considered by some authorities to be a subspecies of M. americana)
 Genus Ozotoceros
 Pampas deer (O. bezoarticus)
 Genus Pudu
 Northern pudu (P. mephistophiles)
 Southern pudu (P. pudu)

Extinct genera
†Agalmaceros
†Antifer
†Bretzia
†Libralces (Considered to be a synonym of Cervalces latifrons)
†Morenelaphus
†Torontoceros
†Eocoileus

References 

 
Deer
Taxa named by Joshua Brookes
Mammal subfamilies